Fernando López Flores (born 29 January 1980) was a Chilean footballer.

He played for Cobreloa.

Honours

Club
Cobreloa
 Primera División de Chile (1): 2004 Clausura

External links
 BDFA Profile

1980 births
Living people
Chilean footballers
Chilean Primera División players
Club Deportivo Palestino footballers
Cobreloa footballers
Everton de Viña del Mar footballers
O'Higgins F.C. footballers
Ñublense footballers
Santiago Morning footballers
Association football defenders